"Holoship" is the first episode of Series V of the science fiction sitcom Red Dwarf and the twenty-fifth in the series run. It was first broadcast on the British television channel BBC2 on 20 February 1992 in the 9:00 PM evening time slot. It was written by Rob Grant and Doug Naylor, and directed by Juliet May.

Plot
While travelling aboard a Starbug, Dave Lister, Cat, Kryten, Arnold Rimmer and Holly finish watching a movie. While Lister is left in tears and Kryten praises the film, Rimmer shows disgust over the romantic elements of its plot, claiming no man would abandon their dreams for a woman they love, especially one they will never see again. Holly interrupts the discussion by alerting the group to the presence of another craft. The group discover the craft to be a holoship called the Enlightenment – a purely holographic vessel, not detectable on any sensors, crewed entirely by computer-generated holograms of Space Corps elite personnel. Rimmer is subsequently taken aboard and delights in finding himself able to exist in a place where he can touch, feel and taste without any form of assistance, further surprised that Enlightment upholds a regulation that crew members have sex twice a day.

Rimmer becomes attracted to one such crew member, Commander Nirvanah Crane. He falls in love with her, and decides to ask the ship's captain to join the crew. However, he learns that the crew is already full but that if he passes an intelligence contest against another crew member, he will be recruited at the expense of his opponent's existence. Concerned he will fail, Rimmer opts to cheat and has Kryten give him a mind-patching operation to increase his IQ. The patch fails during the contest, leading Rimmer to abandon it halfway through and disrupt Lister, Cat and Kryten's interviews for a new hologram to request a new one. Kryten tells him that his mind cannot readily accept a patch. However, Rimmer is delighted when his opponent suddenly withdraws, and bids farewell to his friends before transporting onto the Enlightment. Upon learning that Nirvanah was his opponent and that she sacrificed herself for his happiness, Rimmer finds himself renouncing his earlier belief on romance (even to his own disbelief), resigns his new commission, and returns to Red Dwarf in order to let Nirvanah be reinstated with her crew.

Production
The Enlightenment's model was built by Paul McGuiness. One of the cut scenes showed the holoship changing shape. The transparent perspex miniature was also a casualty of the editing cut. Besides the holoship special effects, other scenes and lines were cut out or trimmed down, including many holoship crew scenes and Holly's unhelpful speech to Rimmer.

Guest stars included Jane Horrocks as Cdr. Nirvanah Crane, Matthew Marsh as Capt. Hercule Platini, Don Warrington as Cdr. Binks, Simon Paisley Day as Cdr. Randy Navarro – Number Two, Jane Montgomery as Cdr. Natalina Pushkin – Number One, and Lucy Briers as Harrison. The two (uncredited) actors heard in the film at the beginning of the episode were Kate Robbins and Steve Steen.

Cultural references
King of Kings, the story of Jesus, is mentioned by Lister as a film that Rimmer stated as unrealistic.
Kryten references Albert Einstein in trying to convince Rimmer that he is more than his job.
Rimmer suggests that St. Francis of Assisi said "Never give a sucker an even break". Kryten states that if so it must have been strictly off the record.

Reception
Although "Holoship" was filmed third in the series, it was chosen to lead off the series as it was felt that it would draw in viewers the same way as "Camille" had done during the previous series. It worked in the sense that the viewing figures increased as the series progressed. However the episode was considered the worst in the series by fans, having a 0.2% rating on the Red Dwarf Smegazine poll. With its out-of-place moment of pathos at the end of the episode, Sci-Fi Dimensions described it as "less like Red Dwarf and more like a rejected Star Trek episode."

Continuity goof

One of the biggest issues with continuity in Red Dwarf is the fact that the ship can only sustain one hologram. When Rimmer returns to Red Dwarf to get more of the mind patch, there is a hologram in the room with the others. This could be considered a mistake in continuity; however, Rimmer's hologrammatic status could be projected by the holoship, allowing for Red Dwarf to sustain the other hologram. Red Dwarf has projected two holograms in the past, for a short period (such as "Me2", which closed season one), although both these were holograms of Rimmer.

References

External links

 
 
 Series V episode guide at www.reddwarf.co.uk

Red Dwarf V episodes
1992 British television episodes
Holography in television